Kavita Devi may refer to:

 Kavita Devi (journalist), Indian journalist and co-founder of Khabar Lahariya
 Kavita Devi (kabaddi), Indian kabaddi player
 Kavita Devi (wrestler), Indian professional wrestler